Philip Gordon Ney (born in 1935) is a Canadian psychiatrist, clinical psychologist and psychotherapist.

Biography 
He is professor of University of British Columbia. He has taught at University of Calgary, University of Montreal, University of Hong Kong and University of Otago. Founder and director of International Institute for Pregnancy Loss and Child Abuse Research and Recovery (IIPLCARR) and International Hope Alive Counselors Association (IHACA).

He is a leading world expert on the effects of abortion, abuse & neglect, and key concepts developed by Dr Ney during years of clinical work with thousands who have been damaged severely, are used in Hope Alive group psychotherapy, and copied in many other therapies.  He has trained counsellors around the world seeing peer-reviewed improvements in those being treated - even when dealing with deep wounds. In recent years he ran for several political positions including Provincial Member of the Legislative Assembly. He is a controversial figure who has led a colorful life.

Research 
He has conducted research in child abuse and its connection to abortion. He has authored or co-authored 7 books and 66 scientific papers.

He has created Hope Alive method of psychotherapy.

Selected books 
 Ending the Cycle of Abuse: The Stories of Women Abused as Children and the Group Therapy Techniques That Helped Them Heal (1994) Brunner/Mazel, Inc. 
 Deeply Damaged (1997) Pioneer Publishing. 
 Abortion Survivors (1998) Pioneer Publishing. 
 Hope Alive: Post Abortion and Abuse Treatment, a Guide for Group Counselling (1998) Pioneer Publishing.

Legal troubles 

Dr. Philip Ney, has been charged with animal cruelty following the death of his 6-year-old mix-breed dog “Star”. Ney is a psychiatrist who ran for public office several times, including 2 terms as a Victoria School Board Trustee.

References

Canadian psychotherapists
Canadian psychiatrists
Living people
1935 births
Academic staff of the University of British Columbia